Hepatocystis pteropi is a species of parasitic protozoa. The vertebrate hosts are mammals.

Hosts 
This species was described by Breinl in 1913 in the black flying fox (Pteropus gouldii). It has also been found in  Pteropus conspicillatus, and Pteropus scapulatus.

Distribution 
The species has been found in Asia and Australia.

References 

Parasites of bats
Haemosporida